Friedrich Kasimir Medikus (or Friedrich Casimir Medicus; 6 January 1738 – 8 July 1808) was a German physician and botanist.

He was born at Grumbach and became director of the University of Mannheim (Theodoro Palatinae Mannheim) and curator of the botanical garden at Mannheim. He encouraged the cultivation of locust trees (Robinia) in Europe.

The genus Medicusia was named after him by Conrad Moench (now considered synonymous with Picris).

References

18th-century German botanists
1738 births
1808 deaths
People from Kusel (district)